Hnarakert or Hunarakert ( or) is an antique castle which was located at the border of the Gugark and Utik provinces of Greater Armenia, on the Kura River (the Kazakh region of modern Azerbaijan). 

According to Rafayel Matevosian, "From Koti the road diverts to Tiflis and from there to Hunarakert. The latter was the border point of Armenia, Georgia and Caucasian Albania."

Etymology
See Hnarakert for etymology.

References

Castles and fortresses in Azerbaijan